Bayfront Park may refer to:

Bayfront Park in downtown Miami, Florida
Bayfront Park (Sarasota, Florida)
Bayfront Park (Daphne, Alabama)
Bayfront Park (Hamilton, Ontario)
Bayfront Park (Millbrae, California)
Bayfront Beach Park in Maryland